Black Womantalk was a British publishing cooperative of women of African and Asian descent founded in 1983.

History
Based in London, Black Womantalk was "set up in 1983 by a group of unemployed Black women of African and Asian descent who felt strongly about creating the space and the means for our voices to be heard." Originally there were eight members, including Olivette Cole Wilson and Bernadine Evaristo. By 1989 there were three members: Cole Wilson, Da Choong and Gabriela Pearse.

Most of Black WomenTalk's effort went into organising open readings and workshops for Black women writers.  They also released two anthologies of Black women's writing: a 1987 poetry anthology Black Women Talk Poetry, and a 1991 short story anthology, Don't Ask Me Why.

Publications
 Black Womantalk, Da Choong, Olivette Cole Wilson, Bernadette Evaristo and Gabriela Pearce, eds., Black Women Talk Poetry. London: Black Womantalk Cooperative, 1987. 
 Da Choong, Olivette Cole Wilson and Sylvia Parker (eds.) Don't Ask Me Why: An Anthology of Short Stories by Black Women. London: Black Womantalk Press.

References

Publishing cooperatives
Publishing companies established in 1983
Black British literature
Book publishing companies of the United Kingdom
Feminist book publishing companies